Henry W. Brinkman(1881–1949) was an American architect from Emporia, Kansas who practiced from 1910 to 1947.

History
Henry Brinkman was born in Westphalia on April 30, 1881. After emigrating to America, his family settled in Olpe, Kansas. He graduated from Kansas State College's school of architecture in 1907. He went into partnership with Stanley Hagen in 1925, which continued until Brinkman's retirement in 1948. He died on December 7, 1949.

His Romanesque style St. Joseph Catholic Church in Damar, Kansas was built in 1912. Several of his works survive and are listed on the U.S. National Register of Historic Places.

Notable works
Works (attribution) include:
Cathedral of the Nativity of the Blessed Virgin Mary, 204 S. Cedar St., Grand Island, NE, NRHP-listed
Hoisington High School, 218 E 7th St., Hoisington, KS, NRHP-listed
St. Joseph Catholic Church, built 1912, 105 N. Oak St., Damar, KS, NRHP-listed
St. Ludger Catholic Church, Jct. of MO K and High St. Montrose, MO, NRHP-listed
Seven Dolors Catholic Church, NE of the jct.of Juliette and Pierre Sts., Manhattan, KS, NRHP-listed

References

20th-century American architects
1881 births
1949 deaths